Jankwa (or Janko) is a Newar ritual in Nepal to commemorate the young, elderly and infants in the community.

Types of Jankwa
There are two types of jankwa: 
 Macha jankwa, celebrated once
Jyah Jankwa (Bhim Ratharohan) which can be celebrated up to five times.

References

Newar